Friedrich Wilhelm Alexander von Mechow (December 9, 1831 in Lauban – March 14, 1904 in Jugenheim) was a Prussian explorer of Africa, and a naturalist. Von Mechow was a specialty collector of phanerogams, particularly in Angola. He held the rank of major in the Prussian Army.

Von Mechow  joined the Loango-expedition under Paul Güssfeldt. He undertook a second larger exploration between 1879 and 1882 in Angola, where he explored the middle course of the Kwango River. He  collected birds for Jean Cabanis and Anton Reichenow at Museum für Naturkunde in Berlin.

Several species are named for him including a butterfly (Papilio mechowi ), the dusky long-tailed cuckoo (Cercococcyx mechowi ), and Mechow's mole-rat (Fukomys mechowii ).

Von Mechow is commemorated in the scientific name of a species of African snake, Xenocalamus mechowii, and also Mechowia, a genus of flowering plants from Angola, Zambia and Zaïre, belonging to the family Amaranthaceae.

Works
Mechow: Kartenwerk meiner Kuango-Expedition. 28 Blätter. Berlin

References

Additional references
James A Jobling, 2009 Helm Dictionary of Scientific Bird Names 
Personensuche

External link

19th-century German zoologists
1904 deaths
1831 births
19th-century German botanists
People from Lubań
German explorers of Africa
People of the Franco-Prussian War